The Croatian Labourists – Labour Party is a social-democratic and democratic socialist political party in Croatia.

It was formed in 2010 by a former trade unionist and People's Party MP Dragutin Lesar, who was the party's only member of parliament in the 6th assembly.

In the 2011 parliamentary election, the party won six seats in the Croatian Parliament.

Ahead of the 2015 parliamentary election the party joined the ruling Croatia is Growing coalition with the Social Democratic Party of Croatia and liberal parties. As a result, MP Mladen Novak resigned in protest and joined the green party ORaH.

Election history

Legislative

European Parliament

See also
Left wing politics in Croatia

References

External links

2010 establishments in Croatia
Democratic socialist parties in Europe
Labour parties
Political parties established in 2010
Social democratic parties in Croatia